St. Peter am Hart, also Sankt Peter am Hart is a municipality in the district of Braunau am Inn in the Austrian state of Upper Austria.

Geography
Sankt Peter lies in the Innviertel. About 15 percent of the municipality is forest and 63 percent farmland.

Localities

 Aching (80)
 Aham (55)
 Aselkam (174)
 Bergham (145)
 Bogenhofen (322)
 Dietfurt (219)
 Guggenberg (9)
 Hagenau (192)
 Hart (18)
 Heitzenberg (25)
 Hundslau (5)
 Jahrsdorf (183)
 Meinharting (8)
 Moos (136)
 Nöfing (106)
 Ofen (87)
 Reikersdorf (270)
 Schickenedt (14)
 Spraid (14)
 St. Peter am Hart (351)
 Wimm (9)

See also
 Oberösterreich

References

Cities and towns in Braunau am Inn District